Johan Herbert Westermark (30 August 1891 – 29 October 1981) was a Swedish physician. Westermark served as Surgeon-in-Chief of the Swedish Navy and head of the Swedish Naval Medical Officers' Corps from 1937 to 1956. He also competed at the 1912 Summer Olympics.

Early life
Westermark was born on 30 August 1891 in Stockholm, Sweden, the son of Professor, M.D. Frans Westermark and his wife Maggie Cnattingius. He was the brother of radiologist Nils Westermark.

Career

Medical career
Westermark received a Licentiate of Medicine degree in Stockholm in 1918 and then worked as an assistant physician (underläkare) at Karlskrona Hospital in 1919, aman at the obstetrics clinic at Allmänna BB in Stockholm in 1921. Westermark then worked at the gynecological clinic from 1923 to 1924 and as a general practitioner in Stockholm in 1925. He received a Doctor of Medicine degree in 1926 and worked in Bromma from 1926 to 1930.

Westermark became a naval surgeon of the 2nd class in the Swedish Naval Medical Officers' Corps in 1918 and of the 1st class in 1920. Westermark served as a staff doctor in the Coastal Fleet from 1925 to 1930, 1934 and in 1935. He was appointed 1st naval surgeon in the Swedish Naval Medical Officers' Corps in 1936. From 1937 to 1956, Westermark served as Surgeon-in-Chief of the Swedish Navy and head of the Swedish Naval Medical Officers' Corps as well as Inspector for the Navy's Medical Service.

Westermark was a member of the board of the Swedish Medical Society (Svenska läkaresällskapets nämnd) from 1930 to 1955 and one of the principals for Oscar II Jubilee Fund from 1937. Westermark wrote about personal history, naval medicine, obstetrics and gynecology.

Sports career

Westermark was also a sailor who competed in the 1912 Summer Olympics. He was a crew member of the Swedish boat Sans Atout, which won the silver medal in the 8 metre class.

Personal life
In 1920, Westermark married Elly Carlström (born 1898), the daughter of Ludvig Carlström and Lisa Andersson. They had three children: Hans (born 1922), Gunnar (born 1926), Lars (born 1929).

Awards and decorations
Westermark's awards:

Commander First Class of the Order of the Polar Star
Commander of the Order of Vasa
King Gustaf V's Olympic Commemorative Medal
Swedish Red Cross Silver Medal
Trafvenfelt Gold Medal

Honours
Member of the Royal Swedish Academy of War Sciences
Member of the Royal Swedish Society of Naval Sciences
Honorary member of the Association of Military Surgeons of the United States

References

External links
profile

1891 births
1981 deaths
Swedish military doctors
Military personnel from Stockholm
Swedish male sailors (sport)
Sailors at the 1912 Summer Olympics – 8 Metre
Olympic sailors of Sweden
Olympic silver medalists for Sweden
Olympic medalists in sailing
Medalists at the 1912 Summer Olympics
Members of the Royal Swedish Academy of War Sciences
Members of the Royal Swedish Society of Naval Sciences
Commanders First Class of the Order of the Polar Star
Commanders of the Order of Vasa
Naval surgeons